His is a village in Arendal municipality in Agder county, Norway. The village is located in the central part of the island of Hisøya, along the Skaggerak coast. The village is the site of the historic Hisøy Church.

References

Villages in Agder
Arendal